Andropova is a rural locality (a village) in Yorgvinskoye Rural Settlement, Kudymkarsky District, Perm Krai, Russia. The population was 15 as of 2010.

Geography 
Andropova is located 18 km north of Kudymkar (the district's administrative centre) by road. Shipitsyna is the nearest rural locality.

References 

Rural localities in Kudymkarsky District